In the motorsport discipline of rallying, Group Rally3 is a formula of rally car specification determined by the FIA for use in its international competitions: the World Rally Championship (WRC) and regional championships. National rallying competitions also allow Group Rally3 cars to compete. There are three technical subclasses of Group Rally3 however these do not affect competitive eligibility so 'Rally3' may be used alone with the same definition. The group was launched in 2021 with the homologation of the first car after the introduction of the Rally Pyramid initiative to reorganise the classes of car and championships in international rallying was approved in June 2018.

Group Rally3 cars were created to fill a gap in demand where existing four-wheel-drive (4WD) options such as Group Rally2 or Group Rally2-Kit were considered to be too expensive for cost conscious privateers and too high performance for newcomers to 4WD. Two-wheel-drive R3 cars from Group R were at level RC3 with the mentioned Rally2 and Rally2-Kit at level RC2 in the FIA's sporting classes. With the introduction of Rally3, R3 were reclassified to RC4.

Definition
Group Rally3 cars are defined in FIA document 'Appendix J - Article 260' as Touring Cars or Large Scale Series Production Cars, petrol engine, 4-wheel drive. A production touring car with at least 2500 identical units manufactured must be homologated in Group A, with all the components and changes that make it a Group Rally3 car homologated in an extension.

The subclasses are based on engine cylinder capacity in common with existing Group Rally4 classes, allowing for possibility of upgrade or sharing of many components with a Rally4 car. The group is designed to be entry level and the most cost-efficient way to go rallying with four-wheel drive. The FIA have included a rally-ready price cap of €100,000 in the homologation requirements. The cars have been described as a modern-day Group N and a 4WD version of the Rally4/R2 and with a 31mm restrictor, have a maximum power-to-weight ratio of 5.1kg/hp.

FIA Competition
Rally3 cars are placed alone in FIA 'RC3' sporting class.

Cars

See also
 Rally Pyramid
 Groups Rally
 Group Rally1
 Group Rally2
 Group Rally4
 Group Rally5
 Fédération Internationale de l'Automobile

References

External links

 

 
Rally groups